Kang Hyung-seok (born January 1, 1992) is a South Korean stage, movie and television actor. He is best known for his role in drama Do Do Sol Sol La La Sol (2020), Hometown Cha-Cha-Cha (2021), Lost (2021) and movie Ajoomma (2022).

Career 
After graduating from Theater and Film Department, Kang debuted in theater in 2016 with play Crazy Romance. In 2018 he joined another play Re-meet, followed by a Musical Evil Dead. By chance, he had a meeting with a casting manager in charge of in tvN drama Crash Landing on You. Those led into his television debut role as North Korean Soldier in the drama in 2019.

In 2020, he’s done various minor roles in KBS Drama Special, JTBC drama Itaewon Class and Dr. Romantic 2. His first support role was as Ahn Jung-ho in Netflix and KBS2 simulcast drama Do Do Sol Sol La La Sol. This role led him into exclusive contract with his current Agency AM Entertaintment.

In 2020 he venture into big screen through supporting role Kim Eui-song, in indie movie  by Director Cho Seung-won. Director Cho Seung-won developed a short story based on his experience of serving as a KATUSA Soldier (a South Korean soldier attached to the USFK) and made it into a feature film. It was released in October 2021.

In 2021, Kang Hyung-seok won audition for role of Choi Eun-cheol, a police officer at the Gongjin Police Station in tvN drama Hometown Cha-Cha-Cha. In the same year, He also cast as role of Jun-hyeok in JTBC drama Lost.

In 2022, Kang appeared as main lead with Singapore actress Hong Huifang in the Korean-Singapore joint film Ajoomma. It was unveiled for the first time at the 27th Busan International Film Festival (BIFF). Invited to the 'New Currents' section of 27th BIFF competition, this film tells the story of a Singaporean housewife who is obsessed with Korean dramas and travels to Korea alone.  Kang took on the role of Kwon-woo, a travel guide who fluent in Chinese and works hard for a living. Kwon-woo is a person who lives a difficult life due to the pressure of debt and is separated from his family.

Filmography

Film

Television

Stage

Musical

Theater

Ambassadorship 
 Public relations ambassador for the 3rd ASEAN Film Week (2023)

References

External links 
 
 
 Kang Hyung-seok at Daum Encyclopedia 
 Kang Hyung-seok at PlayDB 

Living people
1992 births
21st-century South Korean male actors
Male actors from Seoul
South Korean male stage actors
South Korean male television actors